Mountfield Hokejový Klub is a professional men's ice hockey club based in Hradec Králové, Czech Republic. It is a member of the Czech Extraliga. The club was formed after the original HC Mountfield was unable to resolve a sponsorship dispute.

History
Mountfield HK aligns itself with the history of Královští Lvi, a club formed in Hradec Králové in 1926 that operated a men's team until 2013. In the meantime, Mountfield a.s., a Czech-based home and garden retailer, owned and operated a hockey club in České Budějovice from 2006 to 2013.

Following the 2012–13 season, the Czech Extraliga reached a sponsorship deal with Radegast to sell its beer in all Extraliga arenas. This agreement conflicted with the naming rights deal České Budějovice already had with Budweiser Budvar Brewery for their arena. Under the agreement, the club and the city would face stiff penalties for selling any beer other than Budvar products. Unable to resolve the dispute, the club decided on 18 June 2013 that no agreement could be reached between the parties involved and voted to immediately relocate to Hradec Králové for the 2013–14 season.

Since then, Královští Lvi has been Mountfield HK's youth program, while Motor České Budějovice inherited Hradec Králové's spot in the Czech 1.liga.

Honours

Domestic
Czech Extraliga
  3rd place (1): 2016–17

Czech 1. Liga
  3rd place (1): 2006–07

1st. Czech National Hockey League
  Winners (1): 1992–93
  Runners-up (1): 1982–83

2nd. Czechoslovak Hockey League
  Winners (2): 1966–67, 1967–68

International
Champions Hockey League
  Runners-up (1): 2019–20

Players

Current roster

Champions Hockey League, CHL
Mountfield Hradec Králové (professional ice hockey team) lost the Final of the Champions Hockey League, CHL year 2020 against Frölunda, Sweden.

References

External links
 Official website 

Hradec Kralove
Hradec Kralove
Sport in Hradec Králové
1925 establishments in Czechoslovakia
Ice hockey clubs established in 1925